The Apón Formation is a geological formation in northwestern Venezuela (Maracaibo Basin) and northern Colombia (La Guajira), whose thick-bedded limestone interbedded with subordinate amounts of dark gray calcareous shale and sandy shale strata date back to the Early Cretaceous (Late Aptian epoch). Pterosaur remains of Ornithocheiridae indet. (=?Anhangueridae indet.) are among the fossils that have been recovered from the formation.

Fossil content 
The following fossils, among others, have been found in the Apón Formation at Toas island: Spiroculina sp., Orbitolina concava, Gryphaeostrea, Amphidonte (Ceratostreon) boussingaulti, Ostrea sp., Amphitriscoelus waringi, Requienia sp., Parahoplites sp., Cheloniceras sp., Quinqueloculina sp., Triloculina sp., and Panopea (Myopsis) plicata in Río Negro.

See also 
 List of pterosaur-bearing stratigraphic units

References

Bibliography 
 
 

Geologic formations of Colombia
Geologic formations of Venezuela
Lower Cretaceous Series of South America
Cretaceous Colombia
Cretaceous Venezuela
Limestone formations
Marl formations
Shallow marine deposits
Aptian Stage
Fossiliferous stratigraphic units of South America
Paleontology in Venezuela
Geography of La Guajira Department
Geography of Zulia
Maracaibo basin
Colombia–Venezuela border